Grand Prix Herning is a one-day road bicycle race, held in Midtjylland, Denmark.

The race is organised by Herning Bicycle Club with both start and goal in Herning.

The race is characterised by its gravel paths, which result in multiple punctures for the racers.

The many paths and defects makes the race very selective, and it is often won by a solo rider or from a small group.

Grand Prix Herning gained prominence with Bjarne Riis's victories in 1996 (the same year that he won Tour de France), 1997 and 1998.

For several years the race was run as part of the UCI's calendar, with a fixed spot for the coming spring. It has gained the nickname "A spring day at the heath" (En Forårsdag på heden) with the hidden hint to Jørgen Leth's film on Paris–Roubaix, A Sunday in Hell (En Forårsdag i Helede).

The race has had multiple economic problems and was not held in 2008. The race was returned in 2009, and was held until another break again in 2012 due to the Giro D’Italia start*11 in the city. In 2013 the race was run as a UCI race for the last time.

In 2014 the race got a helping hand from the Danish Cycling Federation which wrote the race in as part of the Post Cup (today known as the PostNord Cup). The race is now a returning part of the Danish Cup Series.

Gravel paths 
Updated 2016

Point scale

Winners

Comments 
"Genius Race. Really impressive. International Cut. Supreme by Herning Bicycle Club. Five stars out of five". Jens Veggerby, Herning Folkeblad. 24 May 1993.

"A good race, faintly similar to Paris–Roubaix." Frédéric Moncassin, Herning Folkeblad. 12 June 1995.

"A Body-painted Price girl, VIP Bus with refreshments, a Member of Parlament (Folketinget) as speaker and the written program, as was laying and waiting at your hotelroom and a resultlist at the same place after the race. What else can you demand? A bikerace in topclass!" Henrik Elmgreen, Cycling, 19 May 1996

"There are also Tennisplayers that arent so good on pavel." Jens Veggerby's Comment after having been set on a Pavelroad, 11 May 1997

"This is no doubt the best bet on a grand Danish bikerace." Rolf Sørensen, Jyllands-posten, 25 May 1998

"I am very happy to win this. Denmarks biggest Bikerace." Bjarne Riis, BT, 25 May 1998

"This is a Great race, but it is very nice to know the roads in advance." Jesper Skibby, Herning Folkelblad, 25 May 1998

"The race are the nicest race I have participated in on Danish soil." Rolf Sørensen, Herning Folkeblad, 25 May 1998

"The race are perfect – this could well develop to the first Danish World Cup race." Chairman for DCU, Peder Pedersen, Herning Folkeblad, 25 May 1998

"A bad racer will not win Grand Prix Midtbank, but good racers can be knocked out by accident." Henrik Elmgreen, Cycling, 15 May 1998

"The entire race seems very wellorganised." Chief Commissioner Michael Andersson, Herning Folkeblad, 18 May 2000

"This was one of the coolest race i have raced, Love the comibnation with the Gravel Paths, A race for Men, Like Paris–Roubaix." Kurt Asle Arvesen, Gpherning.dk, 3 November 2016

References

External links 
 Grandprix Hernings website
 Herning Cykle Klub

1992 establishments in Denmark
Cycle races in Denmark
Recurring sporting events established in 1992
Sport in Herning
UCI Europe Tour races
Spring (season) events in Denmark